Proteinase 3, also known as PRTN3, is an enzyme that in humans is encoded by the PRTN3 gene.

Function 
PRTN3 is a serine protease enzyme expressed mainly in neutrophil granulocytes. Its exact role in the function of the neutrophil is unknown, but, in human neutrophils, proteinase 3 contributes to the proteolytic generation of antimicrobial peptides. It is also the target of anti-neutrophil cytoplasmic antibodies (ANCAs) of the c-ANCA (cytoplasmic subtype) class, a type of antibody frequently found in the disease granulomatosis with polyangiitis.

References

Further reading 

 
 
 </ref>

External links 
 

EC 3.4.21